The March 2022 South Korean by-elections was held on 9 March 2022, along with the 2022 presidential election. In this election, 5 MPs were elected, replacing the respective predecessors.

Constituencies and reasons

List of by-elections

Anseong

Daegu Central-South

Jongno

Sangdang

Seocho 1st

References 

March 2022 South Korean by-elections